The New York Central Railroad's 1290 and 1291 were a pair of Canadian F-82 4-6-0 "Ten-Wheelers". They were built in July and November 1900 by the Canada Southern Railway in the company's St. Thomas, Ontario, shops. Costing $18,537.82 each, they originally received the numbers 449 and 454. Four years later, the railroad was leased to the Michigan Central Railroad for 99 years, and the two locomotives were renumbered to 8152 and 8153 in 1905. In 1929, the railroad was subleased to the New York Central, where it became its St. Clair Subdivision. During this time, the two steam engines were principally used on the St. Clair Subdivision, along with the Fort Erie and Niagara Falls branch lines. The locomotives were renumbered again in 1936, to 880 and 881. This lasted 12 years before they were renumbered a final time, to 1290 and 1291.

Despite the great purging of steam-powered engines on the Central in the 1950s, 1290 and 1291 were not immediately replaced. By 1955, they were two of only 44 steam locomotives left running on the entire New York Central system. At some point in their later careers, water towers were removed from along the line; for all runs after, 1290 and 1291 ran with an auxiliary water tender behind the normal tender.

In 1955 and 1956, employees of Trains visited the line. On the latter trip, Jim Shaughnessy accompanied photographers Philip Hastings and John Krause and commented that the engines were virtually still in their 1900 form:

Both locomotives lasted well into the diesel age. 1291 ran until 1956, while 1290 ran until April 27, 1957. Having an estimated $4,928.57 in scrap value, 1290 was broken up in St. Thomas, while 1291 was taken to Buffalo, New York. The branch line lasted only three years beyond that.

The two locomotives were inducted into the North America Railway Hall of Fame in 2006.

References

External links 

New York Central Railroad locomotives
4-6-0 locomotives
Individual locomotives of the United States
Steam locomotives of the United States
Scrapped locomotives